Candice Martello, better known by her stage name Hemming, is an American musician and singer-songwriter. Her solo career was launched via Make or Break: The Linda Perry Project.

Career
Formerly part of the punk duo Omar, she became a solo artist as a contestant on the VH1 reality show Make or Break: The Linda Perry Project at the suggestion of host Linda Perry. She was co-winner of the show, earning a recording contract. She released a self-titled debut album in 2015. That same year, she opened for Chris Cornell on his solo tour.

Personal life
Candice graduated from Drexel University. She is a lesbian, coming out publicly on Make or Break: The Linda Perry Project.

Discography
 Hemming (2015)
 Waiting/Wasting (2019)

References

External links

  (official website)

American women guitarists
American women singer-songwriters
Guitarists from Pennsylvania
American lesbian musicians
American LGBT singers
American LGBT songwriters
Living people
Musicians from Philadelphia
Participants in American reality television series
Singer-songwriters from Pennsylvania
Year of birth missing (living people)
21st-century LGBT people
21st-century American women singers
Lesbian singers
Lesbian songwriters